San Marcos is a district and the head city of the canton of Tarrazú in the province of San José in Costa Rica.

History
The city was founded in the 1820s by agricultural migrants from the Central Valley.  The region's earliest residents were dedicated to growing basic foodstuffs, namely beans, corn, and sugar cane.  Local farmers started growing coffee in the highland valley in the 1890s.  The region is best known for its high quality coffee.

Geography
San Marcos has an area of  km² and a mean elevation of  metres.

It is located in a mountainous area known as Los Santos Zone, 70 kilometers south of the national capital city of San José.

San Marcos de Tarrazu is located in the north bank of the Pirris River, in a highland valley surrounded by mountains that are part of the Talamanca Sierra in southern Costa Rica. Downtown San Marcos is 1350 meters above sea level but is surrounded by peaks as high as 3000 meters above sea level.

Its geography is suited to growing coffee, mostly because the slopes of the mountains face the morning light and the cloud cover protects the coffee trees in the afternoon. The red soil found in the valley is of volcanic origin. All this plus the altitude make ideal conditions to grow the coffees harvested by locals.

Politics
This region has a deep-seated political relationship with the Liberación Nacional political party that stems back to the 1948 Civil War.  Jose "Pepe" Figueres and his troops  were not only headquartered in the neighboring community of Santa Maria de Dota, but the main concentration camp of political prisoners for these forces was housed in San Marcos' school.  Moreover, a vast majority of Figueres' foot soldiers were from the present-day cantons of Tarrazu, Dota, and Leon Cortes. Furthermore, most of Figueres' workers at his cabuya hacienda, "La Lucha Sin Fin," were from this same region.

Economy
Traditionally, cultural and economic progress have been directly tied to the coffee industry. More recently, however, other agricultural products, namely avocados,  have helped farmers keep afloat in years of coffee decline.  Perhaps the key reason this region has managed to retain its coffee production, while other regions in Costa Rica have been unable to do so has been immigration.  Indeed, since the 1960s this region has exported a considerable percentage of its workforce to the United States.

Transportation

Road transportation 
The district is covered by the following road routes:
 National Route 226
 National Route 303

Flora and fauna

The district of San Lorenzo has been almost overlooked by coffee farmers mostly because of its lowlands and tropical weather. However, more recently tourism has flourished thanks to its pristine forests and clean rivers, the proximity to the Quepos plains and Manuel Antonio National Park. Giant pre-historic ferns and hardwoods can be found here. Birds such as the Quetzal and small mammals are abundant.

Demographics

For the 2011 census, San Marcos had a population of  inhabitants.  
The majority of its people grow coffee in the mountains surrounding the city. San Marcos de Tarrazú has been known in the green coffee trade industry as a source of coffee beans. Nearby towns of Santa Maria and San Pablo are also sources of specialty coffee beans. Roman Catholics comprise approx. 90% of the local population. Due to coffee picking, Nicaraguans and Panamanian native americans are settling in the valley in record numbers.

Culture
Local culture varies little from that of the rest of Costa Rica, in that the Catholic Church and the Costa Rican state both play a critical role in determining days of celebration.  Indeed, the annual Patron Saints' Day Festival is both a civic and a religious event.  Whereas much of Costa Rica has allowed the cultural importance of coffee production to decline, this region is deeply wedded to this crops' production.  This is evident in the fact that a majority of the region's children continue to pick coffee, a custom that has largely gone out of fashion in the Central Valley where coffee picking is almost entirely done by foreign laborers, namely Nicaraguans.  
The region has a number of bars, dance halls, and brothels but few other spaces for leisure activity.

Notable people
 Maria Eugenia Bozzoli (born 1935), anthropologist

References 

Districts of San José Province
Populated places in San José Province